OurPrisoner was a 2006 Internet reality television show that featured 35-year-old man Kieran Vogel, who lived on camera for 24 hours a day, seven days a week, for an entirety of six months in a single-family New Jersey home.

The show began on June 14, 2006. All of Vogel's actions were to be controlled by the public. Through a series of votes, viewers were to choose what he ate, what he wore, what he did, and whom he saw.

The OurPrisoner show came to an end on 15 December 2006 and Vogel received 40,000 shares of BigString stock as his prize, now worth 3 cents a share; had he failed to perform any tasks, he would have received nothing.

According to the press release, "Through an interactive media platform viewers will vote to determine what Kieran Vogel wears, what he eats, whom he dates, to whom he talks, what music he listens to, and much, much more. He will also react to viewer calls and emails."

In September, he was required to stay awake for 48 hours straight.

The series was created by BigString Interactive. BigString's CEO Darin Myman was the creator of the show.

BigString announced that a second series would be held, but it never surfaced.

See also
Lifecasting (video stream)

References

External links
 OurPrisoner, official site (defunct as of early 2008)
 BigString, official sponsor

2006 American television series debuts
2006 American television series endings
2000s American reality television series
Reality web series
American non-fiction web series